The 1st Signal Brigade ("First to Communicate") is a military communications brigade of the United States Army subordinate to the Eighth United States Army and 311th Signal Command in Hawaii, and located at Camp Humphreys in South Korea.

History

Vietnam War
The 1st Signal Brigade was activated on 1 April 1966 in South Vietnam. The brigade's mission was to originate, install, operate, and maintain a complex communication system that fused tactical and strategic communications in Southeast Asia under a single, unified command. The formation of the brigade brought together three signal groups that were already in South Vietnam.

At the peak of the Vietnam War the brigade consisted of more than 23,000 soldiers, in six Signal groups (including the 160th Signal Group), 22 signal battalions and several communications agencies, making the 1st Signal Brigade the largest signal unit in the U.S. Army at the time.

South Korea to present
On 7 November 1972 the brigade was relocated to the Republic of Korea under the United States Army Strategic Communications Command. On 29 January 1973 the 1st Signal Brigade was reestablished by General Order 56 from HQ, USASTRATCOM. The brigade's mission in South Korea is to provide communications support to the Eighth United States Army, United States Forces Korea and the United Nations Command. The brigade was also given the mission of installing, maintaining and operating the Defense Communications System in South Korea.

Subordinate units
 1st Signal Brigade
 Headquarters and Headquarters Company (HHC)
 41st Signal Battalion
 304th Expeditionary Signal Battalion (304th ESB)
 U.S.Army Communications Information Systems Activity, Pacific

Lineage
 Constituted 26 March 1966 in the Regular Army as Headquarters and Headquarters Company, 1st Signal Brigade
 Activated 1 April 1966 in Vietnam

Campaign participation credit
Vietnam
 Counteroffensive
 Counteroffensive, Phase II
 Counteroffensive, Phase III
 Tet Counteroffensive
 Counteroffensive, Phase IV
 Counteroffensive, Phase V
 Counteroffensive, Phase VI
 Tet 69/Counteroffensive
 Summer‐Fall 1969
 Winter‐Spring 1970
 Sanctuary Counteroffensive
 Counteroffensive, Phase VII
 Consolidation I
 Consolidation II
 Cease‐Fire

Decorations
 Meritorious Unit Commendation (Army), Streamer embroidered VIETNAM 1966‐1967
 Meritorious Unit Commendation (Army), Streamer embroidered VIETNAM 1967‐1969
 Meritorious Unit Commendation (Army), Streamer embroidered VIETNAM 1970‐1972
 Army Superior Unit Award, Streamer embroidered 2007

Citations

References

External links
 Official homepage: 1st Signal Brigade 

Military units and formations established in 1966
001
Military units of the United States Army in South Korea
Military units and formations of the United States Army in the Vietnam War